"Cheapskate" is a song from English rock band Supergrass's second album, In It for the Money (1997). It was released only in the United States and Canada in 1997, rising to number 35 on the US Billboard Hot Modern Rock Tracks chart and number 11 on the Canadian RPM Alternative 30. While being only a 7-inch jukebox single with "Going Out", it has an accompanying music video that was left off the Supergrass Is 10 DVD. The song is said by the band themselves to have drawn influences from Kool & the Gang.

Credits and personnel
Credits are taken from the In It for the Money album liner notes.

Studio
 Recorded at Sawmills Studio (Golant, UK)

Personnel
 Supergrass – writing, production, mixing, co-arrangement
 Rob Coombes – writing
 John Cornfield – production
 Sam Williams – mixing, co-arrangement

Charts

References

Supergrass songs
1997 singles
1997 songs
Capitol Records singles
Songs written by Rob Coombes